The Information Technology University (ITU) is a public university in Lahore, Punjab, Pakistan. Founded in 2012, the university was founded and headed by Umar Saif  and is modeled after the MIT.

The university is located within the high-rise Arfa Software Technology Park, while its permanent 183 acre campus is under construction on Barki Road. The university has varying degrees of partnerships with the Harvard University and also publishes the MIT Technology Review, Pakistan edition. The university is home to several tenured academics, Pakistan's largest startup incubator and maintains partnerships with EdX, IBM and the US State Department. It hosted International Development Design Summit, organised by IDIN and United States Agency for International Development (USAID).

History

Foundation and Vision
ITU was established in 2012 in order to advance scholarship and innovation in the areas of science, technology and engineering. ITU aspires to emulate the success of Massachusetts Institute of Technology through focus on cross-disciplinary applied research, the cultivation of an entrepreneurial culture in teaching and research, the maintenance of a close collaboration with the Information and Communication Technology industry and the development of strong ties with government funding agencies. With a structure that combines the best features of both public and private sector universities, ITU aims to serve as a center for excellence in academia, research, entrepreneurship and innovation.

Faculty 
The university was formerly led by Umar Saif (PhD from University of Cambridge) who has previously taught at the Cambridge–MIT Institute. 
Dr. Sarfraz Khurshid (PhD from MIT) was the second Vice Chancellor of the University. Prof. Dr. Adnan Noor Mian (PostDoc from University of Cambridge) is the current Vice Chancellor of the University.

It has four faculties:
 Faculty of Humanities and Social Sciences
 Faculty of Business and Management Sciences
 Faculty of Sciences
 Faculty of Engineering
ITU offers following programs:
 BS (Computer Science)
 BS (Electrical Engineering)
 BS (Computer Engineering)
 BS (Management and Technology)
 BS (Economics with Data Sciences)
 MS (Computer Science)
 MS (Data Science)
 MS (Electrical Engineering)
 MS (Development, Technology and Policy)
 Executive MBA in Innovation, Technology and Entrepreneurship (EMBITE)
 PhD (Computer Science)
 PhD (Electrical Engineering)

Research 
ITU is home to several research centers and labs:
 Center for Technology and Governance (CTG)
 Technology and Research in Emerging Networks and Distributed Systems (TRENDS)
 Neighborhood for Emerging World Technologies (NEWT)
 Abdus Salam International Center of Mathematics
 Center For Speech and Language Technologies
 National Centre For Academic Integrity
 Bio-Inspired Simulation & Modelling of Intelligent Life
 Embedded Computing Laboratory
 Scientometrics Lab
 Data Science Lab
 Business Analytics Lab
 Vision Processing Lab
 Innovations for Poverty Alleviation Lab (IPAL)
Between 2013 and 2016 the university has conducted PKR 700 million (approx. US$7 million) in research in science, technology, engineering and mathematics (STEM). It has received research funding from Higher Education Commission (Pakistan), Government of the Punjab, Deutsche Gesellschaft für Internationale Zusammenarbeit (GIZ), World Bank and Department for International Development (DfID).

First Convocation 
The university's first convocation was held on December 17, 2017. `The university awarded its first Honorary Doctorate Degree awarded to Dr. Adil Najam, the inaugural Dean of the Frederick S. Pardee School of Global Studies at Boston University, and former Vice Chancellor of the Lahore University of Management Sciences (LUMS). 139 students of Computer Science and Electrical Engineering graduated in the first convocation.

Second Convocation 
Information Technology University held its second convocation on March 6, 2019 at Aiwan-i-Iqbal, Lahore. In total 181 successful graduates were awarded degrees. 
The successful graduates included 61 of BSCS, 56 of BSEE, 12 of EMBITE, 43 of MSCS and 9 of MSEE.

Lahore Technology Award 
ITU gave Lahore Technology Award at its first convocation to the Massachusetts Institute of Technology’s Nergis Mavalvala for her work in the gravitational theory.

References

External links
 ITU official website

Public universities and colleges in Punjab, Pakistan
Computer science institutes in Pakistan
2012 establishments in Pakistan
Universities and colleges in Lahore
Educational institutions established in 2012
Engineering universities and colleges in Pakistan